The United States Post Office Madison Square Station  is a historic post office building located at 149 East 23rd Street between Lexington Avenue and Third Avenue on the East Side of Manhattan, New York City. In spite of the building's name, it is not located on Madison Square but about three blocks east (approximately 1/4 mile) along 23rd Street. The building runs through the block to East 24th Street, where there are loading docks and another much smaller and less formal public entrance.
 
The building was constructed in 1937, and was designed by Lorimer Rich for Louis A. Simon, the Supervising Architect of the Treasury.  It is a two to three story building clad on its main facade with polished "Dakota Mahogany" granite in the Classical Revival style.  The main facade features six two-story Doric order piers and pilaster that surround the recessed entrance bays.  The exterior also features five bronze relief sculptures by artists Edmond Amateis and Louis Slobodkin illustrating different forms of communication: from west to east, the god Mercury, jungle drums, mail, carrier pigeon, and smoke signals.  The interior features eight murals executed between 1937 and 1939 by artist Kindred McLeary.

The Madison Square Station was listed on the National Register of Historic Places in 1989.

Gallery

References
Notes

External links

Madison Square
Government buildings completed in 1935
Neoclassical architecture in New York City